Euretidae is a family of glass sponges in the order Sceptrulophora.

References

Hexactinellida
Sponge families